Koeppe is a surname. Notable people with the surname include:

Leonhard Koeppe (1884–1969), German ophthalmologist
Koeppe's nodules

See also
Koppe (surname)